James Monroe (September 10, 1799 – September 7, 1870) was an American politician who served as the United States representative from New York (1839–1841). He was the nephew of President James Monroe.

Early life
James Monroe was born in Albemarle County, Virginia on September 10, 1799. He was born to Ann (née Bell) Monroe and Andrew Augustine Monroe (1755–1826). His father was the older brother of his namesake and future president, James Monroe (1758–1831).

His paternal grandfather, Spence Monroe (1727–1774), was a moderately prosperous planter who also practiced carpentry. His grandmother Elizabeth Jones (1730–1774) Monroe in 1752 and they had several children. His paternal 2x-great grandfather, Patrick Andrew Monroe, emigrated to America from Scotland in the mid-17th century. In 1650, he patented a large tract of land in Washington Parish, Westmoreland County, Virginia. Among James Monroe's ancestors were French Huguenot immigrants, who came to Virginia in 1700.

Career
Monroe graduated from the United States Military Academy in 1815, and was commissioned in the Artillery Corps. Shortly after graduating, he was sent to fight in the war with Algiers, and was wounded while serving as a gunnery officer on board the USS Guerriere. From 1817 to 1822, he served as aide-de-camp to General Winfield Scott, receiving a promotion to first lieutenant in December 1818. Upon the re-organization of the US Army in 1821, he was assigned to the 4th Artillery Regiment. In June 1832, he was again appointed as General Scott's aide for the Black Hawk War, but shortly afterward contracted cholera. He resigned his commission on September 30, 1832, and moved to New York City.

Political career
Monroe served as assistant alderman of New York City in 1832, alderman 1833–1835, and president of the board of aldermen in 1834. He was elected as a Whig to the 26th United States Congress, holding office from March 4, 1839, to March 3, 1841. He was a member of the New York State Assembly (New York Co.) in 1850 and 1852.

Personal life
He married Elizabeth "Eliza" Mary Douglas (1799–1852), daughter of George Douglas (1741–1799) and Margaret Corne (1767–1827). Together, they were the parents of::

 George Monroe, who entered the seminary.
 William D. Monroe
 Frances "Fanny" Monroe (1824–1906), who married Douglas Robinson Sr. (1824–1893)

Following his wife's death, he retired from public life to Orange, New Jersey, where he died on September 7, 1870, at age of 70, days before his 71st birthday. He is interred at Trinity Church Cemetery in Manhattan.

Descendants
Monroe's grandson, Douglas Robinson Jr. (1855–1918), married Corinne Roosevelt (1861–1933), the younger sister of President Theodore Roosevelt and an aunt of First Lady, Eleanor Roosevelt. Their children, and Monroe's great-grandchildren include Connecticut Representative Corinne Douglas Robinson (1886–1971) and New York State Senator Theodore Douglas Robinson (1883–1934), who married his distant cousin Helen Rebecca Roosevelt, daughter of James Roosevelt (1854—1927), the brother of Franklin Delano Roosevelt, and Helen Schermerhorn Astor (1855—1893) of the Astor family.

References

External links
 

James Monroe

 

1799 births
1870 deaths
James
People from Albemarle County, Virginia
Members of the New York State Assembly
New York City Council members
American people of the Black Hawk War
United States Army officers
United States Military Academy alumni
American people of the Barbary Wars
Whig Party members of the United States House of Representatives from New York (state)
19th-century American politicians
Burials at Trinity Church Cemetery